Guimarães RUFC is a rugby team based in Guimarães, Portugal. As of the 2012/13 season, they play in the Second Division of the Campeonato Nacional de Rugby (National Championship).

History
The club was founded on 3 November 2008.

External links
Guimarães RUFC at Blogspot

Portuguese rugby union teams
Rugby clubs established in 2008
Rugby